Gowru Charitha Reddy (4 August 1971) is an Indian politician from Andhra Pradesh, India. She represented the Panyam constituency in the 2014 Legislative Assembly of Andhra Pradesh. Earlier she served as a MLA from Nandikotkur constituency (2004-2009) and Panyam constituency (2014-2019). She was also a member of Women and Child welfare committee of Andhra Pradesh Legislative Assembly. She left the Indian National Congress party and joined the newly formed YSR Congress Party. Her husband Gowru Venkata Reddy is also a political leader.

Political career

Gowru Charitha Reddy was elected 2 times to Legislative Assembly of Andhra Pradesh.

In 2004, she contested from Nandikotkur on behalf of Congress Party  and emerged victorious over Byreddy Rajasekhar Reddy a two time Member of the Legislative Assembly.

In 2014, she contested from Panyam on behalf of YSRCP and emerged victorious over Katasani Ramabhupal Reddy, a five time MLA.

In the 2019 Assembly Elections, she quit YSR Congress Party and joined Telugu Desam Party as the YSR Congress party denied her to contest the Assembly elections this time. She contested the election from the side of the Telugu Desam Party and lost it to Katasani Ramabhupal Reddy, who contested from the YSR Congress.

Personal life

Gowru Charitha Reddy is married to Gowru Venkata Reddy and the couple have two children, a son named Gowru Janardhan Reddy and a Daughter.

References

People from Kurnool district
People from Rayalaseema
YSR Congress Party politicians
Andhra Pradesh MLAs 2014–2019
1971 births
Living people
Telugu Desam Party politicians